Middle Hill, or Middlehill, may refer to:

Middlehill, Cornwall, United Kingdom
Middle Hill (Gibraltar), a hill in Gibraltar on which are:
Middle Hill Battery
Middle Hill Cave
Middle Hill (Hong Kong)
Middle Hill in the Ochil Hills, Scotland
Middle Hill (Scottish Borders), Scotland
Middle Hill (Pittsburgh), United States
Middle Hill, Pembrokeshire, United Kingdom
Middle Hill, Staffordshire, United Kingdom
Middle Hill, Worcestershire, United Kingdom, a country house owned by the Phillipps family
Middlehill, Wiltshire, United Kingdom